The 2022 World Rugby Sevens Challenger Series – Men's tour was the second season of the second-tier global rugby sevens competition for men's national teams. It was played as a single tournament on 12–14 August 2022 in Santiago, Chile at the Estadio Santa Laura with twelve teams competing. The tournament was the qualifying event for the World Rugby Sevens Series, with the winner gaining promotion as a core team for the 2022–23 season.

Teams and venue

Pool stage
All times are CLST, Chile Summer Time: (UTC-3).

Pool A

Pool B

Pool C

Ranking of third-placed teams

Knockout stage

9th–12th place bracket

9th–12th place Semi-finals

11th place Final

9th place Final

5th–8th place bracket

5th–8th place Semi-finals

7th place Final

5th place Final

Cup bracket

Cup Quarter-finals

Cup Semi-finals

Third place play-off

Cup Final

Placings
The final placings are listed below, the winner being promoted as a core team for the 2022–23 World Rugby Sevens Series:

Key: 
Core team for the World Rugby Sevens Series in 2022–23.

See also
 2022 World Rugby Sevens Challenger Series – Women's tour

References

External links
Official site

Sevens
Rugby sevens competitions
World Rugby Sevens Challenger Series
World Rugby Sevens